The Colorado Press Association is a non-profit association dedicated to promoting the newspaper industry in Colorado.


History
The Colorado State Press Association was formed in Denver, Colorado on August 8, 1878. In 1889, J.D. Dillenback of the Western Newspaper Association pushed the Colorado Press Association in a new direction, advocating that the CPA should work to raise the professional standards of journalism in the state. 
In 1920 the Colorado Press Association elected its first female president, Lois F. Allen.

See also
Denver Press Club

References

External links
Colorado Press Association Website

Mass media in Colorado
Organizations established in 1878